Pedro Sánchez de la Hoz or Pedro Sancho de la Hoz (1514 in Calahorra, La Rioja – 1547 in Santiago de Chile) was a Spanish merchant, conquistador and adelantado who served as secretary to Pizarro. He was appointed by Charles V, Holy Roman Emperor as an adelantado of the Governorate of Terra Australis in 1539.

Sánchez de la Hoz, served as secretary to Pizarro in Peru during the conquest of Cuzco and wrote an account of the conquest of Peru. While the original manuscript was lost, the work was preserved in Italian translation and has subsequently been translated to other languages, serving as a valuable account of both the Spanish conquest and Incan ethnography. After some financial success, he returned to Spain and was granted leave by Emperor Charles V to return to the New World where he conflicted with rival conquistador Pedro de Valdivia over different grants to lands south of Peru. In 1547 Francisco de Villagra, one of Valdivia's men, had Sánchez de la Hoz executed for leading a rebellion.

According to Argentina and Chile the capitulación granted to Sánchez de la Hoz proves the Spanish Empire had claims and an animus occupandi on the lands that would later be called Antarctica. Given that Chile and Argentina have historically successfully established their border based on the uti possidetis iuris principle of international law the Sánchez de la Hoz grant forms part of their arguments for territorial claims in Antarctica.

References 

1514 births
1547 deaths
People from Calahorra
Spanish conquistadors
Explorers of Chile
16th-century Spanish people
16th-century Chilean people
Executed Spanish people
Executed Chilean people
History of Tierra del Fuego
History of the Falkland Islands
Spain and the Antarctic